Trinity Laban Conservatoire of Music and Dance is a music and dance conservatoire based in Greenwich, London, England. It was formed in 2005 as a merger of two older institutions – Trinity College of Music and Laban Dance Centre. The conservatoire has  undergraduate and postgraduate students based at three campuses in Greenwich (Trinity), Deptford and New Cross (Laban).

Faculty of Music

History

Trinity College of Music was founded in central London in 1872 by Henry George Bonavia Hunt to improve the teaching of church music. The College began as the Church Choral Society, whose diverse activities included choral singing classes and teaching instruction in church music. Gladstone was an early supporter during these years. A year later, in 1873, the college became the College of Church Music, London. In 1876 the college was incorporated as the Trinity College London. Initially, only male students could attend and they had to be members of the Church of England.

In 1881, the College moved to Mandeville Place off Wigmore Street in Central London, which remained its home for over a hundred years. The college took over various neighbouring buildings in Mandeville Place. These were finally united in 1922 with the addition of a Grecian portico, and substantial internal reconstruction to create a first floor concert hall and an impressive staircase. However, other parts of the college retained a complicated layout reflecting its history as three separate buildings. The building is now occupied by the School of Economic Science.

Trinity moved to its present home in Greenwich in 2001. The east wing of King Charles Court was constructed by John Webb as part of a rebuilding of Greenwich Palace; it was subsequently absorbed into the Royal Naval Hospital complex, designed in part by Sir Christopher Wren, which had later become part of the Royal Naval College (RNC). To make the buildings suitable for Trinity's use and remove the accretions of a century of RNC occupation required a substantial refurbishment programme. Work to provide new recital rooms revealed that the building's core incorporates masonry from the Tudor palace. The overall cost of the move to Greenwich was £17 million.

Junior Trinity

Many of the college's staff also teach at Junior Trinity, a Saturday music school for exceptional young musicians who are keen on pursuing a musical career. Junior Trinity offers instrumental and vocal tuition for children and young people ages 5–19, along with GCSE and A-Level courses in Music and Music Technology for older students. Many students of Junior Trinity often continue their musical studies at top conservatoires and universities across the country. Trinity was the first music college to create such a department, and many conservatoires have now followed in Trinity's steps.

Admission

Admission into the Faculty of Music is by competitive auditions, held annually in November or December and March or April. The Faculty of Dance asks for similar qualifications and entry is also by audition; auditions are held at Trinity Laban itself and also at selected venues across Europe and the US. The Conservatoire has an acceptance rate of around 9.9% making Trinity Laban one of the most selective schools in the UK and Europe.

Trinity College London

Trinity College London was founded in 1877 as the external examinations board of Trinity College of Music. Today, the board's examinations are taken by students in over 60 countries, giving external students the opportunity to attain qualifications across a range of disciplines in the performing arts and arts education and English language learning and teaching. Trinity College London is based at the Blue Fin Building in central London. Trinity College London validated Trinity College of Music's Graduate Diploma (the GTCL) before it was replaced by the BMus model in 1997.

Trinity College of Music's historical association with the Masonic Order
Trinity College of Music has an historical association with Freemasonry, with the Trinity College Lodge No 1765 being founded in 1878 by seven early teaching members of the college who were freemasons, including the founder, the Reverend Henry George Bonavia Hunt. In the past, freemasonry was an important though private feature of the life of the College, among both members of staff and the undergraduate and postgraduate men. Trinity College Lodge is no longer associated with the college, since no member of the college belongs to it. However, by co-incidence, the College's patron, the Duke of Kent, has been Grand Master of the United Grand Lodge of England since 1968.

Faculty of Dance

History

Laban Dance Centre was founded in Manchester as the Art of Movement Studio by Rudolf Laban, an Austro-Hungarian dancer, choreographer and a dance/movement theoretician.

In 1958, the school moved from Manchester to Addlestone in Surrey, and then in 1975 to New Cross in London, where it was renamed the Laban Centre for Movement and Dance. In 1997, it was renamed the Laban Centre London. In 2002, the centre moved to newly built premises in Deptford and was renamed Laban.

The faculty today
Laban offers undergraduate, postgraduate (including Transitions), among other courses. The Faculty of Dance also provides classes for adults and young people on the local community, including the Centre for Advanced Training. In 2019, the London International Screen Dance Festival was introduced by the institution.

Laban Creekside (Deptford) includes 13 purpose-built dance studios; eight with ballet barres, the 300-seat Bonnie Bird Theatre, a smaller studio theatre, and a dance library. Laban Laurie Grove (New Cross) also has a number of studios and performance laboratories.

Architecture award
Designed by Swiss architects Jacques Herzog and Pierre de Meuron (who won the Pritzker Prize in 2001 and who also designed the Tate Modern and the National Stadium in Beijing for the 2008 Olympic Games), the centre's building in Deptford won the Stirling Prize for Architecture in 2003. Herzog and de Meuron collaborated with visual artist Michael Craig-Martin to create the building. The building includes an eco-technological roof known as a "brown roof".

After parts of the building's cladding were damaged by Storm Eunice in February 2022, The Twentieth Century Society repeated 2020 calls for the Deptford building to be listed, so that any repairs respected the building's design quality. If it was added to the Heritage List for England it would become its first 21st century building.

Notable alumni

Music

 Howard Arman (conductor)
 Peter Arnold (pianist)
 Sir Granville Bantock (composer)
 Sir John Barbirolli (conductor)
 Helen Bower (violinist)
 Thomas Bowes (violinist)
 Mairead Carlin (singer)
 Edith Coates (mezzo-soprano)
 Avril Coleridge-Taylor (pianist, conductor, composer)
 Deva (composer, singer)
 Wilberforce Echezona, musicologist
 Predrag Gosta (conductor, harpsichordist)
 Gavin Greenaway (composer)
 Heather Harper (soprano)
 Stjepan Hauser (2Cellos) (cellist)
 Ilaiyaraaja (composer, singer, songwriter)
 Albert Ketèlbey (composer)
 Fela Kuti (musician, activist)
 Sunny Li (pianist)
 Amaal Mallik (composer, singer)
 Mantovani
Andrew Matthews-Owen (pianist / accompanist)
 Cecilia McDowall (composer)
 Salim Merchant (composer)
 Mickey J. Meyer (composer)
 Tom Misch (producer, composer, singer, guitarist)
 Eric Parkin (pianist)
 Margaret Price (soprano)
 Marcella Puppini (singer)
 A. R. Rahman (composer, singer, songwriter)
 Anirudh Ravichander (composer, music director, singer, songwriter, record producer, arranger, instrumentalist, conductor)
 Amy Shuard (soprano)
 Iyad Sughayer (pianist)
 Lana Trotovšek (violinist)
 Philip Turbett (bassoonist)
 Barry Wordsworth (conductor)

Dance
 Lea Anderson (choreographer, artistic director, MBE)
 Radhika Apte (actress)
 Cressida Bonas (actress)
 Sir Matthew Bourne (choreographer, KBE )
 Bilinda Butcher (vocalist/guitarist of My Bloody Valentine)
 Chisato Minamimura (Japanese dancer and choreographer)
 Anjali Jay (actress and dancer)
 Nighat Chaudhry (Kathak Dancer)

Notable staff
Current and former staff include:

 Deniz Arman Gelenbepiano, Head of Piano Department 2007–2016, Juilliard School, student of Adele Marcus and Gyorgy Sandor
 Richard Arnellformer Professor of Composition
 Peter ArnoldProfessor of Piano
 Mulatu Astatkeconga drums
 Issie Barrattcomposer
 Gabriele Baldocci- piano
Andrew Bernardi-violinist
 Oliver Butterworthformer Professor of Violin
 Nicholas Claptonsinger (former Professor of Singing)
 Natalie Cleincello
 Christine CroshawProfessor of Piano, Chamber Music and Accompaniment
 Alison CrumProfessor of Viola da gamba, member of the Rose Consort of Viols
 Meredith DaviesPrincipal 1979–88
 Graham Anthony Devineclassical guitar
 Terry Edwardsconductor
 Myers Foggin Principal
 Philip Fowkepiano
 Sophie FullerMusicology
 Harry Gabborgan professor
 Henry Geehlconductor, composer, pianist 
 Rivka Golaniviola
 Philip Jonesformer Professor of Trumpet (founder of the Philip Jones Brass Ensemble)
 Mark Lockheartjazz saxophonist
 Joanna MacGregorpiano (honorary Professor)
Andrew Matthews-Owen pianist and coach
 Stephen Montaguecomposer
 Andrew Poppycomposer
 Joan Rodgerssoprano
 Daryl Runswickcomposer
 Yonty Solomonpianist (Professor of Piano)
 Stephen Stirlinghorn
 John Tavenercomposer (former Professor of Composition)
 David Thomassinger (bass)
 John Ashton Thomascomposer
 Philip Turbettbassoon (modern and historical)
 Jan Van Dykedance
 Vasko Vassilevviolin
 Marguerite Wolffpiano

References

External links
 Trinity Laban Conservatoire of Music and Dance – official website
 Reviews and Courses – profile on WhatUni

 
2005 establishments in England
Contemporary dance in London
Dance schools in the United Kingdom
Educational institutions established in 2005
Herzog & de Meuron buildings
Music schools in London
Performing arts education in London
Universities UK